Meghann Shaughnessy (born April 13, 1979 in Richmond, Virginia) is an American former professional tennis player. She achieved a career-high singles ranking of world No. 11 in 2001 and won six titles on the Women's Tennis Association (WTA) Tour. Her best doubles ranking was world No. 4, and she won 17 WTA Tour doubles titles, including the WTA Championships in 2004. She is best known for her serve, which was one of the most powerful on tour, and has produced as many as 22 aces in a match.

Shaughnessy was coached and managed by Rafael Font de Mora for most of her career. She is the niece of Dan Shaughnessy, a Boston Globe sports columnist.

Career
Shaughnessy made her debut on the WTA Tour in 1996 in Budapest and broke into the top 100 in 1998. In 2000, she won her first WTA singles title in Shanghai, defeating Iroda Tulyaganova in the final, and breaking into the top 50. In her breakout year of 2001, she achieved a career-high singles ranking of No. 11, won the second singles title of her career in Quebec City, and reached the finals of Hamburg and her home tournament in Scottsdale, Arizona. She also recorded wins over world number five Conchita Martínez, world No. 4 Monica Seles, and world number two Venus Williams.

In 2002, Shaughnessy began the season by reaching the final of Sydney, and recaptured her career-high No. 11 ranking. She also reached the quarterfinals or better of four other tournaments that year, with wins over top five players Jelena Dokić and Serena Williams. In 2003, Shaughnessy had another strong year, finishing the season in the top 20 for the second time in her career. She captured her third career singles title in Canberra and also had strong Grand Slam results. She defeated Nuria Llagostera Vives, Ľudmila Cervanová, Klára Koukalová and Elena Bovina to reach her first Grand Slam quarterfinal at the Australian Open, and she reached the round of 16 at the US Open. Shaughnessy also scored an upset over world No. 2 Venus Williams, in the round of 16 of the NASDAQ-100 Open in Miami. In 2004, she produced sub-par results, finishing just inside of the top 40, with only one top five win, over Anastasia Myskina in Dubai. However, she obtained the best doubles results of her career, winning seven tournaments with partner Nadia Petrova, including the WTA Tour Championships in Los Angeles.

In 2005, Shaughnessy struggled with injuries and consistency. Her year began with a right leg injury, which forced her to withdraw from the Australian Open doubles competition, and from a tournament in Hyderabad, India. However, she showed signs of recovery in February, reaching the final of Memphis, defeating Nicole Vaidišová in the semifinals. The match featured Shaughnessy serving 22 aces in a 7–6, 7–6 win. After Memphis, Shaughnessy struggled with back injuries for the duration of the spring, not reaching another semifinal until June at the Ordina Open in 's-Hertogenbosch, Netherlands.

By July, Shaughnessy's ranking had dropped so low that she was forced to qualify for the Palo Alto tournament. She qualified, and then surprised fifth seed Vera Zvonareva in the first round, before losing to Daniela Hantuchová in the second round. A back injury forced her to withdraw from tournaments in Carlsbad, California and Los Angeles. As a wildcard in New Haven, she defeated No. 9 seed Nathalie Dechy for the first time in ten attempts, before losing to doubles partner Anna-Lena Grönefeld in the second round. In the opening round of the US Open, Shaughnessy led 16-year-old Sesil Karatantcheva 6–3, 5–2 and held two match points, before losing 6–3, 5–7, 5–7.

However, on March 24, 2006, Shaughnessy beat No. 3 seed Justine Henin 7–5, 6–4 in the second round of the NASDAQ-100 Open in Miami. She then won a WTA-level event in Rabat, beating eighth seeded Martina Suchá in three sets. It was her fourth tour title. She became the first American to win a WTA-level title as well as the first to reach a WTA final in 2006. Shaughnessy afterwards reached the second round at Istanbul, beating third seeded Anna Chakvetadze in the first round. She then fell in the first round in the French Open to top-seeded Amélie Mauresmo, 4–6, 4–6.

The next year, she faced the previous year's runner-up, Svetlana Kuznetsova, in the second round of the French Open. Shaughnessy raced into a 5–0 lead in the first set, and in the sixth game held three set points on Kuznetsova's serve. However, Kuznetsova saved them all, won the game and recovered to clinch the set on a tie-break, before winning the second set 6–3.

Shaughnessy then concentrated on doubles, and regularly partnered with fellow American Bethanie Mattek-Sands. The pair reached the doubles finals of the 2011 Indian Wells Masters, by successively defeating Alisa Kleybanova & Yan Zi, Raquel Kops-Jones & Abigail Spears, Liezel Huber & Nadia Petrova and Victoria Azarenka & Maria Kirilenko, but lost to Sania Mirza and Elena Vesnina in the finals.

Personal life
Shaughnessy was in a relationship with her coach Rafael Font de Mora; they met when she was 13 and she moved in with him a year later. Their romantic and coaching relationship ended in 2005. However, she briefly reunited with Font De Mora as her coach during the latter part of 2006. 

Shaughnessy was in a relationship with Major League Baseball player Roberto Alomar from 2004 to 2006, whom she alleged had exposed her to HIV. The lawyer of Alomar's ex-wife claimed that Alomar paid $4 million in settlements to Shaughnessy and another ex-girlfriend.

WTA career finals

Singles: 10 (6–4)

Doubles: 33 (17–16)

References

External links

 
 

1979 births
Living people
American female tennis players
Sportspeople from Richmond, Virginia
Tennis players from Scottsdale, Arizona
Tennis people from Virginia
Hopman Cup competitors